Bull Creek is a stream tributary to Animas Creek within Hidalgo County, New Mexico.

References 

Rivers of Hidalgo County, New Mexico
Rivers of New Mexico